South African Korfball Federation (SAKF) is the governing body for the sport of Korfball in South Africa. The national body has 10 regional member associations in its organisation structure. It is affiliated with the world governing body International Korfball Federation. SAKF organises men's and women's competitions annually amongst its regional members across age groups. The men's national team have won three All-Africa Korfball Championship and participated at the IKF World Korfball Championship.

Regional members
This is a list of SAKF regional member associations in its governance structure, below them are the Korfball clubs.

 Gauteng East
 Gauteng North
 Sedibeng
 Mpumalanga South
 Stellaland
 Northern Cape
 Southern Cape
 Kwa-Zulu Natal
 Northern Kwa-Zulu Natal
 Eastern Cape

See also

South Africa national korfball team

References

External links
 
 International Korfball Federation official website

Korfball
Korfball in South Africa
Korfball governing bodies